Iwona Podkościelna (born 1 June 1988 in Bychawa) is a Polish road racing paracyclist. She won a gold medal at the 2016 Summer Paralympics for Team Poland in the women's road race B.

References

Living people
Cyclists at the 2016 Summer Paralympics
Medalists at the 2016 Summer Paralympics
Paralympic gold medalists for Poland
Paralympic cyclists of Poland
Polish female cyclists
Paralympic medalists in cycling
1988 births
People from Lublin County
21st-century Polish women